Tazeh Kand (also Romanized as Tāzeh Kand and Tazakend) is a village in Mehranrud-e Markazi Rural District, in the Central District of Bostanabad County, East Azerbaijan Province, Iran. At the 2006 census, its population was 327, in 68 families.

References 

Populated places in Bostanabad County